An aecium (plural aecia) is a specialised reproductive structure found in some plant pathogenic rust fungi that produce aeciospores. Aecia may also be referred to as "cluster cups". The term aecidium (plural aecidia) is used interchangeably but is not preferred.

In some rust fungi such as Phragmidium, aecia lack an outer wall structure (a peridium) but instead produce a diffuse aecium called a caeoma.

In some species of rust fungi with a life cycle including two different host plants, the binucleate spores produced in the aecia cannot infect the current plant host, but must infect a different plant species.

References 

Fungal morphology and anatomy
Reproductive system